Major General Charles Henry Muir (July 18, 1860 – December 8, 1933) was a United States Army officer.

During the final year of World War I, he commanded the 28th Division throughout most of its service on the Western Front. Previously, he served on active duty during the American Indian Wars, the Spanish–American War, the Philippine–American War, and the occupation of Cuba.

Military career
Muir received an appointment to the United States Military Academy (USMA) at West Point, New York in 1881, graduating eighth in his class in 1885. Among his classmates included several officers who would become future general officers, such as Beaumont B. Buck, Joseph E. Kuhn, Henry P. McCain, Robert Michie, George W. Burr, John D. Barrette, John M. Carson Jr., Robert A. Brown, Robert Lee Bullard, William F. Martin, Daniel B. Devore and Willard A. Holbrook.

After receiving his commission as a second lieutenant in the United States Army, Muir was sent to Dakota Territory and later to Fort D. A. Russell in Wyoming. He held first place on the Army Rifle Team in 1890. In 1895, Muir graduated at the head of his class from the Infantry and Cavalry School in Fort Leavenworth in Kansas.

Muir was deployed to Cuba during the Spanish–American War, where he received the Distinguished Service Cross for gallantry in action during the Battle of Santiago de Cuba. On July 2, 1898, he had voluntarily exposed himself to heavy enemy artillery and infantry fire in an action which resulted in the silencing of a piece of Spanish artillery.

Muir was promoted to captain on 2 March 1899. Later that year he was promoted to major and sent to the Philippines. On 19 January 1900, Muir and ten other American soldiers attacked the headquarters of General Miguel Malvar at Rosario in Batangas province, driving Malvar and his men out. Muir's unit took possession of 25,000 Mexican pesos from Malvar's treasury and released 300 Spanish prisoners.

From 1903 to 1907, he was a member of the general staff at Washington, D.C.

Major General Muir succeeded Charles M. Clement as Commander of the 28th Division from 15 December 1917 until 23 October 1918, when he was succeeded by William H. Hay. Muir commanded IV Corps, aided by Briant H. Wells as his chief of staff, until April, 1919 when he succeeded Hay as commander of the 28th Division and led it to the United States for its post-war demobilization. He was succeeded by William G. Price Jr. when the division was reorganized as part of the Pennsylvania National Guard.

From July 1919 to August 1920, MG Muir served as Commandant of the United States Army Command and General Staff College. His final duty assignment was at the War Department in Washington, D.C., after which he retired from the army with the permanent rank of major general.

Awards
He received the Distinguished Service Cross, the Army Distinguished Service Medal, and a Silver Star Citation.  From France, he received a Croix de Guerre.  He was made a Knight Commander of the Order of St Michael and St George.

Death and legacy
He died at the age of 73 on December 8, 1933 and is buried in Arlington National Cemetery.

Family
In 1887, Muir married May Bennett, the daughter of Colonel Clarence Edmund Bennett.  They were the parents of three sons and a daughter, including James I. Muir, who was a career army officer and attained the rank of major general as commander of the 44th Infantry Division during World War II.

Namesakes
 Muir Army Airfield
 USS General C. H. Muir (AP-142) a transport ship
The General Muir, restaurant and deli, Atlanta, Georgia, is named for the ship.

References

Bibliography

External links

 History of Rosario, Batangas at rosariobatangas.com, visited 16 December 2010
 
 

|-

|-

|-

1860 births
1933 deaths
Burials at Arlington National Cemetery
United States Army generals of World War I
United States Army generals
Recipients of the Croix de Guerre (France)
Honorary Knights Commander of the Order of St Michael and St George
Commandants of the United States Army Command and General Staff College
Military personnel from Michigan
American military personnel of the Spanish–American War
American military personnel of the Philippine–American War
United States Army personnel of the Indian Wars
Recipients of the Distinguished Service Medal (US Army)
Recipients of the Distinguished Service Cross (United States)
Recipients of the Legion of Honour
Recipients of the Silver Star